is a Japanese football player for Renofa Yamaguchi.

Club statistics
Updated to 18 February 2019.

References

External links

Profile at Vegalta Sendai

1986 births
Living people
Meiji University alumni
Association football people from Gunma Prefecture
Japanese footballers
J1 League players
J2 League players
Vegalta Sendai players
Yokohama FC players
Association football goalkeepers